Matt Pietrek (born January 27, 1966) is an American spirits and cocktail writer. Previously, he was a computer specialist and author specializing in Microsoft Windows.

Pietrek also has a keen interest in cocktails and spirits, and he writes a blog on the subject.

Pietrek has written several books on Microsoft Windows and for eight years wrote the column "Under the Hood" in MSJ (and subsequently) MSDN Magazine. As of April 2004 he has been working at Microsoft, initially on Visual Studio.

Books

References

External links 
 Pietrek's MSDN blog
 Pietrek's web site
 A Crash Course on the Depths of Win32 Structured Exception Handling - The first and most famous article describing Microsoft's Structured Exception Handling mechanism on the implementation level
 "An In-Depth Look into the Win32 Portable Executable File Format," Part1, Part2 — Pietrek's 2002 MSJ articles describing Win32 Portable Executable file format 
 Peering Inside the PE: A Tour of the Win32 Portable Executable File Format — Pietrek's 1994 MSJ article, the first publicly available material on the subject.

Microsoft Windows people
Living people
1966 births
Microsoft employees
American bloggers